Carl Cox (born 29 July 1962) is a British house and techno club DJ, as well as radio DJ and record producer. He is based in Hove, Sussex, England. 

Cox has won and been nominated for numerous awards. He has performed at numerous clubs and electronic music or dance events worldwide. He has hosted a residency known as "Music is Revolution" every summer season at the Space Ibiza nightclub, from 2001 to 2016. He has featured his own "Carl Cox & Friends" stage at many festivals, such as Ultra Music Festival, The BPM Festival and Tomorrowland. Cox has also served as a monthly DJ for BBC Radio 1's Essential Mix.

He runs the record label, Intec Digital, which was founded around 1998 as Intec Records. Cox also had his own radio show and podcast, entitled Global, which he ran until February 2017.

Early life
Cox was born on 29 July 1962 in Oldham, spent his early life in Carshalton, south London and moved to Brighton in his late teens.

Music career

1977–1990s
At age 15, Cox began working as a mobile DJ, finding a passion for disco music. He began his music career around the same time that Chicago house music found its forefront in the world of dance music. 

In the 1980s, Cox became a mainstage DJ in the electronica industry. He eventually became known as one of the founders of that sound and was part of the emerging British rave scene, and became renowned for the uncommon practice of three-deck mixing. He played at the first night of Danny Rampling's Shoom night after his return from Ibiza in the summer of 1987, a Balearic / Acid House night in London.

In the early 1990s he released his debut single for Paul Oakenfold's Perfecto label, "I Want You (Forever)". Cox continued to create music, eventually embracing techno music that would soon become popular.

He ran Ultimate Base at the now defunct Velvet Underground club on Charing Cross Road, London in the mid-to late 1990s. Cox also played the Millennium on New Year's Eve 1999, by performing in Sydney, Australia, and again in Hawaii after flying back over the International Date Line. He was also global resident DJ for BBC Radio 1's Essential Mix in 1998–99.  In 1997, DJ Magazine chose Cox as the first #1 DJ for its first top 100 poll.

21st century
He broadcast over a decade's worth of Ibiza live mixes from Space, specifically from 2001 to 2016.

In 2001, Cox began a yearly residency at Space Ibiza, a nightclub in Ibiza, Spain. He began playing on the terrace for Space's "We Love... Space on the Terrace". Following that, he played on Thursdays inside the club. For fifteen years, Cox built his residency entitled "Music is Revolution". The final season of Cox's residency was entitled "The Final Chapter" and took place every Tuesday during the summer of 2016. Cox finished the residency on 20 September 2016 by playing a vinyl and CDJ, ten-hour set. Artists who joined Cox on his final night included tINI, Popof, Nic Fanciulli and DJ Sneak. Cox also played at the closing night of the club itself on 2 October 2016.

In 2004, Cox debuted the Carl Cox & Friends arena at Ultra Music Festival, which has since taken place for twelve years. In the film Can U Feel It?, a documentary about Ultra Music Festival, Cox explains that the concept of Carl Cox & Friends came about as a result of not only wanting to play longer sets at festivals, but also to give festival goers an experience within the festival, as Carl has far more creative control over his own stage. The stage is popular with festival goers, and has featured artists like Laurent Garnier, Nic Fanciulli, Loco Dice, Marco Carola, Maceo Plex and many more. Since he created the Carl Cox & Friends concept in 2004, this curated stage has taken place at other festivals and events including Awakenings, EDC Las Vegas, The BPM Festival, Ultra Europe, Tomorrowland, Amsterdam Dance Event and many others.

Cox has performed at clubs such as the Eclipse, Shelley's Laserdome, Sterns Nightclub, Heaven, Sir Henry's, Angels and The Haçienda, as well as raves for Fantazia, Dreamscape, NASA and Amnesia House.

While it was speculated that he would retire in 2017 after he finished his residency at Space Ibiza, Cox has continued to announce festivals and events for 2017 including three showcases at The BPM Festival, his stage at Ultra Music Festival, and two appearances at the Social Festival in Mexico and Colombia. In 2017, Cox was also named the global ambassador of Ultra Music Festival's techno and house music concept, Resistance. Carl Cox also announced the 2017 dates for a festival he has curated entitled Pure Festival, which took place in Sydney and Melbourne, Australia, during April 2017.

After sixteen years of Cox's Global radio podcast, he announced via Facebook that he would no longer be working on the show and that it would end in February 2017.

In 2019 Cox travelled to Australia and worked with Gavin Campbell, producing a remix of Yothu Yindi's song "Treaty", performing live outdoors with Yothu Yindi & The Treaty Project at the Babylon Festival, Carapooee, Victoria, in February 2019.
For 2020, he announced via the Goodwood website that he would be playing a summer festival DJ set at the first of the Three Friday nights at Goodwood Racecourse with a special dedication to the Lloyds before their departure.

Intec
Cox formed his own record label, Intec Records in 1998–9. Intec Records released music from 1999 to 2006. However, in 2006 he decided to put the label on a brief hiatus and relaunched it in 2010 as Intec Digital.

In film
In 1999, Cox starred in the British film Human Traffic as Pablo Hassan, the manager of the Asylum club.

Cox starred in a 2017 EDM-themed documentary titled What We Started with Martin Garrix showing thirty years of EDM history by focusing mainly on his and Martin Garrix's diverging careers. The documentary is co-written, produced and directed by Bert Marcus alongside executive producer and music supervisor Pete Tong.

In music 
Scooter mentions Cox in their 1994 song Hyper Hyper, during which lead singer H.P. Baxxter reads out the name of numerous DJs.

Carl Cox Motorsport 
Cox set up Carl Cox Motorsport in New Zealand in 2013.

Isle of Man TT 
Carl Cox Motorsport backed motorcycle legend Michael Dunlop at the 2022 Isle of Man TT. Dunlop won both Supersport races at the event.

Extreme E 
In January 2023, Carl Cox Motorsport has been confirmed as a new entrant in Extreme E for the 2023 season with Christine GZ and Timo Scheider signed as drivers for the team.

Racing overview

Racing summary

Complete Extreme E results 
(Races in bold indicate best qualifiers; races in italics indicate fastest super sector)

Personal life
 he was living in Hove.

Discography 

Studio albums
 At the End of the Cliche (1996)
 Phuture 2000 (1999)
 Second Sign (2005)
 All Roads Lead to the Dancefloor (2011)
 Electronic Generations (2022)

Awards and nominations

Publications
Oh Yes, Oh Yes!. London: White Rabbit, 2021. .

References

External links 

Carl Cox mix sets
Coxy's big break – the move to Frankston
Carl Cox at Heaven

1962 births
Living people
Club DJs
Black British DJs
English DJs
English people of Barbadian descent
English electronic musicians
English house musicians
English techno musicians
MNRK Music Group artists
Musicians from the Metropolitan Borough of Oldham
People from Oldham
Remixers
Record collectors
Articles containing video clips
Electronic dance music DJs
DJs from Brighton and Hove